Esa Klinga (born 21 November 1939) is a Finnish skier. He competed in the Nordic combined events at the 1964 Winter Olympics and the 1968 Winter Olympics.

References

External links
 

1939 births
Living people
Finnish male Nordic combined skiers
Olympic Nordic combined skiers of Finland
Nordic combined skiers at the 1964 Winter Olympics
Nordic combined skiers at the 1968 Winter Olympics
People from Mikkeli
Sportspeople from South Savo
20th-century Finnish people